The Croatia women's national under-16 basketball team is a national basketball team of Croatia, administered by the Croatian Basketball Federation. It represents the country in women's international under-16 basketball competitions.

FIBA U16 Women's European Championship participations

See also
Croatia women's national basketball team
Croatia women's national under-18 basketball team
Croatia men's national under-16 and under-17 basketball team

References

External links
Archived records of Croatia team participations

Croatia women's national basketball team
Women's national under-16 basketball teams